Andrea Sala may refer to:

Andrea Sala (volleyball) (born 1978), Italian volleyball
Andrea Sala (footballer) (born 1993), Italian footballer
Andrea Sala, mayor of Vigevano since 2010, member of Lega Lombarda